Miguel Ángel Acosta (born April 29, 1999 in Mexico) is a Mexican former footballer currently playing for clubs of Paraguay, Argentina, Chile, Mexico and Guatemala.

Teams
  Sportivo Luqueño 1990-1994
  Colo-Colo 1995
  Olimpia 1996-1997
  Cruz Azul 1998
  Sportivo Luqueño 1999-2000
  Talleres de Córdoba 2000-2001
  Racing Club 2002
  Deportes Puerto Montt 2003
  Coquimbo Unido 2004
  Comunicaciones 2004-2005
  Sportivo Patria 2005
  Guaraní 2006
  General Caballero 2006

External links
 Profile at BDFA
 Profile at En una Baldosa
 

1972 births
Living people
Paraguayan footballers
Paraguayan expatriate footballers
Paraguay international footballers
General Caballero Sport Club footballers
Sportivo Luqueño players
Club Olimpia footballers
Club Guaraní players
Cruz Azul footballers
Racing Club de Avellaneda footballers
Talleres de Córdoba footballers
Colo-Colo footballers
Coquimbo Unido footballers
Puerto Montt footballers
Comunicaciones F.C. players
Chilean Primera División players
Argentine Primera División players
Liga MX players
Expatriate footballers in Chile
Expatriate footballers in Argentina
Expatriate footballers in Mexico
Expatriate footballers in Guatemala
Association football defenders